"Gopikamma" is an Indian Telugu-language song by singer K. S. Chithra and composed by Mickey J. Meyer from the 2014 soundtrack album of the film Mukunda. The song is written by Sirivennela Seetharama Sastry. The song's lyrical version was released on 3 December 2014, while the full video song was released on 2 February 2015 under the music label Aditya Music.

Release 
The teaser of the song was released on 3 December 2014. The lyrical was released on 3 December 2014. The full video was released on 2 February 2015.

Music video 
The music video features Pooja Hegde dancing for the song. The full video song was officially released on 2 February 2015 under Aditya Music label, and gained a lot of views due to its music and picturisation.

Reception

Audience response 
Upon the release of the full video version of the song, it gained lots of appreciation for its music. K. S. Chithra, who sung the song received lots of praise for her work.

Critical reviews 
123Telugu on reviewing the music of the soundtrack wrote that "A typical ladies number which is filled with festivity all over. Chitra’s melodious singing brings a lot of fun to this song which is ably supported by Sirivennela Seetarama Sastry classy lyrics."

IndiaGlitz.com stated that "Mickey completes his album yet again with a traditional song steeped in classical-like music.  Gopikamma is sung by Chitra to perfection.  Needless to say, Sirivennela's putative lyrical depth comes to the fore yet again, embracing the secular and the divine."

Live performances 
K. S. Chithra performed the song at the Swarabhishekam event on 21 January 2018. At the film's audio launch held at Hyderabad on 3 December 2015, Hegde who participated at the event, sang a couple lines from the song while addressing her speech.

Accolades

References

External links

2014 songs
Telugu film songs
Indian songs
Songs with lyrics by Sirivennela Seetharama Sastry